The little nightjar (Setopagis parvula) is a species of nightjar in the family Caprimulgidae.  It is found in Argentina, Bolivia, Brazil, Paraguay, Peru, and Uruguay.

Taxonomy and systematics

The little nightjar was described as Caprimulgus parvulus but since the early 2010s has been placed in its current genus Setopagis. At various times what are now Todd's nightjar (Setopagis heterura) and Anthony's nightjar (Nyctidromus anthonyi) were considered subspecies of little nightjar, but it is now treated as monotypic.

Description

The male is generally grayish brown with buff, brown, and blackish brown spots and streaks. The belly is buff with brown bars. Its hindneck has a broad but indistinct buff collar, the chin is buffy, and the throat is white. Its wing has a broad white band and the outer tail feathers have white tips. The female is similar but its throat is buff and it does not have white on the wing and tail.

Distribution and habitat

The little nightjar is found from eastern Peru across Bolivia and central and northeastern Brazil to the Atlantic coast, and south through southern Brazil, Paraguay, and Uruguay to central Argentina. One vagrant has been recorded in Aruba. In much of the southern part of its range, and possibly in Peru, it is believed to be migratory, moving north and east during the austral winter. It inhabits brushy savanna and the interior and edges of open woodland and forest. It can also be found in plantations of non-native Eucalyptus.

Behavior

Feeding

The little nightjar is nocturnal. It forages by sallying from the ground or a low perch and possibly during continuous flight like some other nightjars. Its prey is insects; though its diet has not been detailed, members of at least five orders have been identified as part of it.

Breeding

The little nightjar's breeding season appears to vary across its range; breeding activity has been noted between August and January. The two egg clutch is laid directly on the ground and both sexes incubate.

Vocalization

The little nightjar's song is "a rattling, clacking, flat, unbirdlike sound in [a] pattern of hurr-ee quick quick quick quick quick quick".

Status

The IUCN has assessed the little nightjar as being of Least Concern. It has a very large range and though its population is unknown it is believed to be stable. No threats have been identified.

References

Further reading

little nightjar
Birds of South America
little nightjar
Taxonomy articles created by Polbot